Dr. Nasser Ashgriz is a professor of Mechanical and Industrial Engineering at the University of Toronto.  Prior to U of T, he was a Professor of Mechanical and Aerospace Engineering at the State University of New York at Buffalo, Buffalo, New York. He obtained his B.S. (1979), M.S. (1981), and Ph.D. (1984) degrees in Mechanical Engineering from Carnegie Mellon University, Pittsburgh, PA, where he was the recipient of two Bennet Prize awards (1981, 1983) in recognition of outstanding scholarly work in Mechanical Engineering.

He has been a visiting scientist at several national laboratories including NASA Lewis Research Center and Phillips Laboratory at Edwards Air Force Base. He has received several awards including the Ralph Teetor Award from Society of Automotive Engineers (1988), The Best Picture Award, from the American Physical Society (1988), the Best Paper Award, from the Combustion Institute (1992), and TOKTEN Award from the United Nations Development Program (1995). He is also the holder of a patent on MultiOrifice Impulsed Spray Generator, Patent No. 4,667,877. Dr. Ashgriz has been a member and has held offices in various professional societies (e.g., ASME K-11 Committee, "Heat Transfer in Fire and Combustion Systems," ASME Winter Annual Meeting, American Physical Society, The Combustion Institute, and the Institute for Liquid Atomization and Spray Systems).

References

External links
 

Living people
Canadian mechanical engineers
Year of birth missing (living people)